Go-Gurt (stylized as Go-GURT), also known as Yoplait Tubes in Canada and as Frubes in Britain and Ireland, is an American brand of low-fat yogurt for children. It can be sucked out of a tube, instead of being eaten with a spoon. It was introduced by the General Mills-licensed brand Yoplait in 1997, as the first yogurt made specifically for children.

Background
Stephen Kaufman of Green Bay, WI, a food scientist, and Jim McGuire, a research and development technician, came up with the invention while working for General Mills in the late 1980s, after Kaufman was browsing through a women's magazine and seeing shampoo samples inserts. The original idea was based on frozen ice pops. Kaufman told the Minneapolis–Saint Paul magazine City Pages that the original conception was for the yogurt to be firm, so the tube would stand straight up — like an ice pop — but when that didn't work out, they shifted toward a creamy  yogurt.

The original idea faced internal opposition at General Mills. Kaufman used hotel shampoo pouches as an inspiration to create prototypes of Go-Gurt, which he made himself on a personal-care product pouching machine he rented, to convince General Mills engineers of the idea's worthiness.

Go-Gurt became a side option in McDonald's Happy Meals in 2014 in strawberry flavor.

Anthropologist Susan Squires claims that her ethnographic research in U.S. American families led her client to the development of Go-Gurt.

Sub-brands
In June 2006, frubes Fizzix, a carbonated yogurt snack, was released under the Yoplait brand. This "sparkling yogurt" was originally developed by Lynn Ogden, a professor in the College of Life Sciences at Brigham Young University (BYU), in 1983. Ogden obtained a patent in 1997 and finally found an interested licensor at General Mills in 2006. BYU receives 55% of the royalties, which will go toward BYU's mentoring program and research, while Ogden receives the rest. Fizzix was available in six flavors, but appears to have been discontinued.

In 2005, frubes Smoothie, a drinkable yogurt for children was released. The product currently comes in four flavors: Strawberry Splash, Paradise Punch, Mango Blast, and Wild Berry.

Internationally
Outside of the U.S., Go-Gurt is sold as "Yoplait Tubes" in Canada, as "Frubes" in the United Kingdom, and was also sold in Japan as "グルト" ("Guruto"). The name was a play on words, as it evoked the sound of gulping a liquid and incorporated part of the Japanese transliteration of yogurt, ヨーグルト (Yo-Guruto). Go-Gurt is also available in Australia where they are known as "Yoplait Go-GURT" or simply "Go-GURT". There is also another brand available in Australia, known as "Yoplait Smackers," aimed at young girls.

Flavors
Generally, each box comes with two different flavors.

Berry / Cherry
Fruit Punch / Strawberry-Banana (Canada)
Melon Berry / Cotton Candy
Peach / Blueberry (Canada)
Raspberry / Grape (Canada)
Strawberry Splash / Berry Blue Blast
Strawberry / Cherry (Canada)
Strawberry / Cotton Candy
Strawberry / Mixed Berry
Strawberry / Punch
Strawberry / Vanilla
Strawberry Banana / Cotton Candy
Strawberry Banana / Raspberry
Strawberry Banana / Watermelon
Strawberry Watermelon / Punch
Strawberry Kiwi/ Fruit Punch

Single-flavor boxes include:
Strawberry

Special editions
Atlantik (Raspberry+Blackberries) / Pacifik (Mango+Litchi) (Canada only, 2011)
Go-Gurt Rush: Extreme Red Rush / Crazy Berry Bolt
Go-Gurt Swirled: Strawberry Milkshake / Banana Split
iCarly: Cherry / StrawberryScooby-Doo Ro-Gurt: Shaggy's Like Cool Punch / 'RawberrySour Patch Kids:  Red Berry / Blue RaspberrySpongeBob SquarePants: Strawberry Riptide / Bikini Bottom BerryStrawberry+Melon / Kaki+Lemon (Canada only, 2012)Wizards of Waverly Place: Cherry / Blueberry

Fizzix
Strawberry Lemonade Jolt / Wild Cherry Zing
Strawberry Watermelon Rush / Blue Raspberry Rage
Triple Berry Fusion / Fruit Punch Charge

Prehistotubes
A limited edition in 2009 had two flavors represented by cave people reminiscent of The Flintstones: Lulutub and Tubôôk. 
Acai (the mascot is Lulutub, a purple-haired woman wearing a black and white dress and a pearl necklace)
Red bayberry (the mascot is Tubôôk, red-haired man wearing a black and red toga)

Twisted
Screamin Green Apple/Strawberry Mango Tango

Marketing
On August 1, 2017 Go-Gurt launched a new campaign titled Kids Never Had It So Easy. The campaign features two "grumpy old fourth graders" bemoaning how easy kids – meaning third graders – have it today.

References

External links
Frubes website (UK) @frubes.co.uk
Frubes page on Yoplait UK website @yoplait.co.uk
Go-GURT website (USA) @gogurt.com
Official Australian Go-Gurt site @gogurt.com.au
Yoplait Tubes website (Canada) @yoplait.ca

Brand name yogurts
General Mills brands
Products introduced in 1999
Yogurts